Three ships of the Royal Navy have borne the name Ludlow after the town in Shropshire:

 , a 5th Rate launched in 1698 and captured by France in 1703.
 , a  launched in 1916 and lost in World War I.
 , a  previously USS Stockton transferred to the Royal Navy in 1940. She was expended as a target ship in 1945.

Royal Navy ship names